Bloodline Champions is a free-to-play action game developed by the Swedish company Stunlock Studios. Bloodline Champions won both "Game of the Year" and "Winner XNA" in the Swedish Game Awards 2009. The game officially launched in the United States on January 13, 2011. The spiritual successor to the game, Battlerite, created by the same developer Stunlock Studios, was released as a free-to-play game on November 7, 2017.

The players in this game are split up into two teams (Warm and Cold) with up to five players per team. The objective is different depending on the game mode, ranging from team deathmatch and capture-the-flag to map point control.

Gameplay

There are four categories of bloodlines (character archetypes): melee attack, ranged attack, healer, and tank.  There are currently 26 bloodlines, with six or seven in each category. Stunlock Studios have announced that they are working on new bloodlines. Each bloodline has seven abilities, two of which have an EX version, an enhanced version of the ability. Each has its own cooldown, as well as triggering short global cooldowns. The seventh ability is an "ultimate" ability that may only be used after gaining sufficient energy through executing other abilities successfully, such as healing allies, damaging enemies, and otherwise helping your team.

Bloodlines also have HP (Health Points) - when the champion runs out of HP, the champion dies, removing it from combat until the end of the round. Each champion also has two items that grant additional abilities. The Bloodline Medallion allows a champion to recover an increasing amount of HP over a period of time and Resurrect revives nearby fallen teammates. Both items require a significant amount of uninterrupted time to prepare, which makes them impractical in immediate combat. In Conquest and Capture The Artifact modes resurrection skill has been replaced with warp skill that allows you to warp a short distance every 20 seconds.

The controls in Bloodline Champions are similar to a first-person shooter, as the bloodline's movement is controlled using the W, A, S, and D keys. The primary two abilities are mapped to the left and right mouse buttons, and the rest of the abilities are used with the Q, E, R, F, and space keys. Almost all the abilities are aimed, where the direction of the ability is determined by the position of the cursor on the screen relative to the champion's position. There are two different camera modes; Free Look and Static. The static camera stays over the characters head at all times regardless of the location of the players cursor. The Free Look camera allows the player to control their camera with the cursor. A few defensive abilities are directed by hovering the cursor on the desired recipient, and some abilities target a specific location on the playing field.

Bloodline Champions also features fog of war which represents the areas of the map which cannot be seen due to visual obstruction or distance. There are obstacles on the map which create fog of war and inhibit movement. Champions have their own collision, which can be used to inhibit movement and protect allies (for example a tank bloodline will have a larger collision size, making it easier to defend teammates by blocking fire, but also being more susceptible to focus fire).

Bloodlines
Bloodline Champions has 27 characters split into 4 archetypes: tank, ranged damage, melee damage, and healer. Tanks are generally close-quarters fighters and specialize in defense as well as peeling; removing pressure from allies by putting equal pressure on enemies. Ranged damage characters have lower health and deal high damage from a safe distance. They generally have many ways to escape melee combat but are taken down quickly if outmaneuvered. These bloodlines generally deal the most damage but must be in close range and have slightly higher health than ranged damage bloodlines. They tend to have very limited ways to control fights aside from their high damage output. Healers, as the title implies, keep their allies alive through a mix of powerful control and healing abilities.  They have the lowest health of all bloodlines and generally lack mobility options other characters enjoy.

Game modes
Bloodline Champions has several game modes that provide different types of gameplay. The central game mode is Arena, as it is the only one available through matchmaking.

Arenas

Players can face an engaging challenge in competing in 2v2, 3v3 and 5v5 arenas.

Capture the Artifact
The objective is to capture both artifacts and bring them back to your own base. Each team begins with one artifact in their base, and the first team to hold both artifacts for a period of time wins the round. The artifacts can be carried and thrown, but lifting one from its starting position takes time and can be interrupted by attacks. The carrier may drop the artifact by using certain abilities as well as receiving attacks by specific enemy abilities. When dropped, the artifact can be instantly picked up after it has sat for a short delay.

Conquest
In Conquest, the players have an infinite amount of respawns but the delay before respawning can increase with time. The teams battle for a number of capture points, and if one team holds all of them, the other team cannot respawn until they capture one of the capture points. To capture a point, the player must stay at that point for a period of time without taking damage or using abilities. The starting point provides a healing aura to the team that started there, and power rune pickups are distributed across the map, allowing champions to temporarily boost their capabilities. A team wins by either killing all the enemy champions while they cannot respawn, or holding the capture points for a set amount of time.

In-game currencies
Bloodline Champions is Free-to-Play (F2P). Bloodlines rotate every day, so there are always four available Bloodlines, one of each archetype. Players earn Blood Coins and spend them on additional Bloodlines, titles, avatars and other visual perks. None of the purchasable items give an edge in gameplay since there are no weapons with higher damage, for example, but they create more variety and choices in gameplay and appearance. Players can also choose to buy Funcom Points by using real money. Funcom Points serve the same purpose as Blood Coins, but they are bought using real currency instead of earned through in-game accomplishments. All marketplace items cost significantly less Funcom Points than Blood Coins.

Reception

Bloodline Champions received mainly favorable reviews from critics; on aggregate review website Metacritic the game attains an overall score of 79 out of 100.

Strategy Informer gave BLC a score of 85% in their review, while PC Gamer gave 75%. Servers are located in Europe and USA; at this time there are no servers in Australia, South America, Africa, or Asia, but there is no area restriction whatsoever, so players in these regions are also able to play.

At release Bloodline Champions announced their participation in DreamHack Summer a LAN tournament with BLC having a $10,000 US prize pool. This helped contribute to the games initial success as a competitive arena game. Since release BLC has had multiple cash prize tournaments hosted by DreamHack and GLHF.gg for a total of $11,600 prize money as of July 11, 2011.

References

External links
 
Bloodline Champions at SGA's website

2011 video games
Action video games
Funcom games
Microsoft XNA games
Multiplayer video games
Video games developed in Sweden
Windows games
Windows-only games